The Tygerberg score is a clinical decision tool that allows the clinician to decide whether pericarditis is due to tuberculosis or not.  It uses five variables:
 Weight loss (1 point)
 Night sweats (1 point)
 Fever (2 points)
 Serum globulin >40 g/L (3 points)
 Blood leukocyte count <10 × 109/l (3 points)

A total score of 6 or more is highly suggestive that tuberculosis is the cause of the pericarditis.

References 
 

Tuberculosis
Medical scales